Rees may refer to:

Places
 Rees, Germany, a city on the lower Rhine
 Rees, Illinois, United States, a community in the Jacksonville, Illinois micropolitan area
 Rees River, a river in New Zealand
 4587 Rees, an Amor asteroid

Other uses
 Rees (surname), a Welsh surname
 Rees algebra, named after the mathematician David Rees
 Rees's Cyclopædia, a nineteenth-century encyclopedia, particularly rich in coverage of science and technology

See also

 Justice Rees (disambiguation)
 Caroline Ruutz-Rees, British American educator and suffragist
 Ree (disambiguation)
 Reece (disambiguation)
 Reese (disambiguation)
 Reis (disambiguation)
 Rhees (disambiguation)
 Rhys, a surname